The 2013 Inter-Provincial Cup was the first season of the Inter-Provincial Cup, the domestic 50-over one-day competition of Ireland. The competition was played between Leinster Lightning, Northern Knights and North West Warriors.

The Northern Knights were the inaugural winners of the competition, following a surprise last day defeat of Leinster Lightning by North West Warriors by 71 runs in Strabane.  That result meant the Northern Knights finished top of the table with 10 points from four matches.

The Inter-Provincial Series has been funded at least partly by the ICC via their TAPP programme.

Final Table

Squads

Fixtures

Records

Highest Individual Innings

Best Bowling in an Innings

Season Aggregates

Most runs

Most wickets

References

See also
2013 Inter-Provincial Championship
2013 Inter-Provincial Trophy

Inter
Inter-Provincial Cup seasons